Becoming Remixed is a remix album by English electronic band Sneaker Pimps, released on 10 March 1998 by Virgin Records. It serves as a companion piece to the band's 1996 debut Becoming X, and was originally limited to 30,000 copies.

Track listing
"Spin Spin Sugar (Armand's Dark Garage Mix)"
"Walking Zero (Tuff & Jam Unda-Vybe Vocal)"
"Post-Modern Sleaze (The Salt City Orchestra Nightclub Mix)"
"Spin Spin Sugar (Armand's Bonus Dub)"
"Post-Modern Sleaze (Reprazent Mix)"
"6 Underground (Perfecto Mix)"
"Tesko Suicide (Americruiser Mix)"
"Roll On (Fold Mix)"
"6 Underground (The Umbrellas of Ladywell Mix #2)"
"Post-Modern Sleaze (Flight from Nashville)"

References

External links

Becoming Remixed at Sneaker Pimps Legacy

Sneaker Pimps albums
1998 remix albums
Virgin Records remix albums
Trip hop remix albums